Fettjeåfallet is a waterfall located just west of Klövsjö in Fettjeån (Fättjeån), Jämtland, Sweden. It is a popular destination of hikers in the summer and for ice climbing in the winter.

References

Waterfalls of Sweden
Geography of Jämtland County